Conus malabaricus is a species of sea snail, a marine gastropod mollusc in the family Conidae, the cone snails, cone shells or cones.

These snails are predatory and venomous. They are capable of "stinging" humans.

Description
The length of the shell attains 55 mm.

Distribution
This marine species occurs off Kerala, India and off Sri Lanka.

References

 Monnier E., Limpalaër L. & Tenorio M.J. (2017). Virgiconus malabaricus (Gastropoda, Conidae), a new cone snail from Southern India, with taxonomic notes on related species. Xenophora Taxonomy. 14: 22-28

External links
 

malabaricus
Gastropods described in 2017